The Pagani Utopia is a mid-engine sports car produced by the Italian sports car manufacturer Pagani. It was developed under the 'C10' codename and presented on the 12th of September 2022 at the Teatro Lirico in Milan. It is a third car model by Pagani, succeeding Pagani Huayra, with more power and a manual gearbox option. A total of 99 examples of the closed coupé model are planned with possible open and track variants. All 99 coupés are already assigned to the customers.

Development
Pagani Utopia was developed over the period of over six years and utilised eight complete prototypes. Three of those prototypes were dedicated to engine testing that lasted about two years. A total of twelve scale models were made: ten at 1:5 scale and two 1:1 scale models.

Specifications
Utopia's forged aluminium double wishbone suspension was based on experience gathered throughout the track-only Huayra R's development. The engine weighs 262 kg dry. Pagani partnered with Xtrac to develop a 7-speed gearbox that will be mounted transversally and is available as pure manual or an automated manual and coupled with an electro-mechanical differential by a triple plate clutch.

References

Pagani vehicles
Rear mid-engine, rear-wheel-drive vehicles
Coupés
Cars introduced in 2022
Flagship vehicles